Courland Bay may refer to:

 Great Courland Bay also known as Turtle Beach, near Fort Bennett (Tobago) 
 Little Courland Bay also known as Mount Irvine Bay, Tobago 
 Courland Bay, in Tasmania, near Cape Lodi and Isaacs Point